Echoes of a Summer is a 1976 Canadian-American family drama film directed by Don Taylor, based on the play Isle of Children by Robert L. Joseph, who also adapted the screenplay. It stars Jodie Foster, Richard Harris, Lois Nettleton, Brad Savage, and Geraldine Fitzgerald. The film follows; Deirdre Striden (Foster), a perceptive 11-year-old girl with an incurable heart ailment. Her mother, Ruth (Nettleton), wants to continue to take her to new doctors, although she knows that treatment is futile. Her father, Eugene (Harris), thinks she should be at their lake house, living in denial of her condition. It is only through her friendship with her 9-year-old neighbor, Philip (Savage), that Deirdre is able to honestly face the reality of death.

Echoes of a Summer was released in limited theatres in Canada in April 1976. Although mostly dismissed by the critics and audiences at the time of its release, the film was notable for an acclaimed performance by Foster, who also had her breakthrough that year with four prominent releases, including Taxi Driver.

Plot
The eleven-year-old Deirdre (Jodie Foster) suffers from an incurable heart condition. For two years, her parents Eugene (Richard Harris) and Ruth (Lois Nettleton) have consulted heart specialists – but without any success. Now they have gone to Mahone Bay, Nova Scotia to ensure that her last days are as pleasant as possible. The nine-year-old neighbour boy Phillip (Brad Savage) is the only one who brings a little happiness into the home, since Deirdre knows exactly what is wrong with her. After she suffers from an acute attack and the end comes faster than everybody had thought, Deirdre and Phillip succeed anyway in celebrating the twelfth birthday of the girl as a day of joy.

Cast
Jodie Foster - Deirdre Striden 
Richard Harris - Eugene Striden 
Lois Nettleton - Ruth Striden 
Geraldine Fitzgerald - Sara 
William Windom - Dr. Hallet 
Brad Savage - Philip

External links

1976 films
1976 drama films
American drama films
American films based on plays
Canadian drama films
Canadian films based on plays
English-language Canadian films
1970s English-language films
Films about death
Films directed by Don Taylor
Films set in Nova Scotia
Films shot in Nova Scotia
United Artists films
1970s American films
1970s Canadian films